New Vintage may refer to:

 New Vintage: The Best of Simon May, a 1994 compilation album
 New Vintage (Maynard Ferguson album), 1977